Yuwen Zhang is an American professor of mechanical engineering who is well known for his contributions to phase change heat transfer. He is presently a Curators' Distinguished Professor and Huber and Helen Croft Chair in Engineering in the Department of Mechanical and Aerospace Engineering at the University of Missouri in Columbia, Missouri.

Education and career
Yuwen Zhang earned his B.E. degree in thermal turbomachinery, M.E. and D.Eng. degrees in engineering thermophysics from Xi'an Jiaotong University, in 1985, 1988 and 1991, respectively. He taught at Xi'an Jiaotong University from 1991 to 1994 and was a research associate at Wright State University (1994-1995) and University of Connecticut (1995-1996). He received a Ph.D. degree in mechanical engineering from the University of Connecticut in 1998. He was a research scientist at University of Connecticut and a senior engineer at Thermoflow, Inc. before joining the Department of Mechanical Engineering at New Mexico State University as an assistant professor in 2001. He joined the faculty at the Department of Mechanical and Aerospace Engineering at the University of Missouri (MU) in 2003 as an associate professor and became a full professor in 2009. He was awarded a James C. Dowell Professorship in 2012 and served as the Department Chair from 2013 to 2017. He was named a Curators' Distinguished Professor in 2020 and a Huber and Helen Croft Chair in Engineering in 2021.

Technical contributions

Yuwen Zhang's research area is in the field of heat and mass transfer with applications in nanomanufacturing, thermal management, and energy storage and conversion. He has published over 300 journal papers and more than 180 conference publications at national and international conferences. He has developed pioneer models for a latent heat thermal energy storage system, as well as multiscale, multiphysics models on additive manufacturing (AM), including selective laser sintering (SLS)  and laser chemical vapor deposition/infiltration (LCVD/LCVI). He is the first to develop fundamental models of fluid flow and heat transfer in the oscillating heat pipes, which is a heat transfer device that can be used in thermal management of electronic devices and energy systems. He carried out theoretical studies on femtosecond laser interaction with metal and biological materials from molecular scales to system levels, and solved inverse heat transfer problems for the determination of the heating condition and/or temperature-dependent macro and micro thermophysical properties under uncertainty. He also investigated the mechanism of heat transfer enhancement in nanofluids, which are stable colloidal suspensions of solid nanomaterials with sizes typically on the order of 1-100 nm in the base fluid, via molecular dynamics (MD) simulations. Thermal management and temperature uniformity improvement of Li-ion batteries using external and internal cooling methods were also systematically studied by utilizing pin fin heat-sinks and metal/non-metal foams, as well as using electrolyte flow inside the embedded microchannels in the porous electrodes as a novel internal cooling technique.

Professional services
Yuwen Zhang is the Co-Editor-in-Chief for Frontiers in Heat and Mass Transfer (FHMT), Associate Editor for ASME Journal of Heat Transfer, as well as an editorial board member for eight other journals. As a Fellow of ASME, he was the Chair (2012-2014) and the Vice-Chair (2009-2012) of the K-15 Committee on Transport Phenomena in Manufacturing and Materials Processing of the ASME Heat Transfer Division. As an Associate Fellow of AIAA, he was a Member of the AIAA Thermophysics Technical Committee (2008–2011). He is also a Fellow of the American Association for the Advancement of Science (AAAS) and a member of the American Society for Engineering Education (ASEE). In these capacities, he has served as congress, track, and session chair for numerous national and international conferences in engineering.

Honors and awards
Huber and Helen Croft Chair in Engineering, University of Missouri, 2021
Curators' Distinguished Professor, University of Missouri, 2020
Coulter Award, University of Missouri Coulter Translational Partnership Program, 2018
Fellow, American Association for the Advancement of Sciences (AAAS), 2015
James C. Dowell Professorship, University of Missouri, 2012
Certificate of Appreciation for Service as K-15 Committee Chair, ASME Heat Transfer Division, 2014
Certificate of Distinguished Service, American Institute of Aeronautics and Astronautics (AIAA), 2011
Missouri Honor Senior Faculty Research Award, College of Engineering at the University of Missouri, 2010
Chancellor's Award for Outstanding Research and Creative Activity, University of Missouri, 2010
Fellow of American Society of Mechanical Engineers (ASME), 2007
Associate Fellow of American Institute of Aeronautics and Astronautics (AIAA), 2008
Faculty Fellow Award, College of Engineering at University of Missouri, 2007
Computational Research Award, Department of Mechanical Engineering, New Mexico State University, 2003
Young Investigator Award, Office of Naval Research (one of 26 awarded nationally in all fields), 2002

Books
Fundamentals of Multiphase Heat Transfer and Flow (with A. Faghri, 2020) 
 Advanced Heat and Mass Transfer (with A. Faghri and J. Howell, 2010)
 Transport Phenomena in Multiphase Systems (with A. Faghri, 2006)

Edited Books
 Heat Pipes: Design, Applications and Technology (2018)
 Multiscale Thermal Transport in Energy Systems (with Y. L. He, 2016)
 Femtosecond Lasers: New Research (2013)
 Nanofluids: Research, Development and Applications (2013)

References

External links

Biographical information at the University of Missouri

University of Missouri faculty
Educators from Columbia, Missouri
People from Columbia, Missouri
University of Connecticut alumni
Xi'an Jiaotong University alumni
New Mexico State University faculty
Fluid dynamicists
Thermodynamicists
Fellows of the American Society of Mechanical Engineers
Fellows of the American Association for the Advancement of Science
American mechanical engineers
Chinese emigrants to the United States
Chinese mechanical engineers
1965 births
Living people